Houbricka incisa, common name the incised turbonilla,  is a species of sea snail, a marine gastropod mollusk in the family Pyramidellidae, the pyrams and their allies.

Description
The shell grows to a length of 6.4 mm.

Distribution
This species occurs in the following locations:
 Gulf of Mexico (from Georgia to Yucatan)

References

  K.J. Bush (1899), Descriptions of New Species of Turbonilla of the Western Atlantic Fauna, with Notes on Those Previously Known;  Proceedings of the Academy of Natural Sciences of Philadelphia, Vol. 51, No. 1 (Jan. - Mar., 1899), pp. 145-177

External links
 To Biodiversity Heritage Library (1 publication)
 To Encyclopedia of Life
 To ITIS
 To World Register of Marine Species

Pyramidellidae
Gastropods described in 1899